East Macquarie was an electoral district of the Legislative Assembly in the Australian state of New South Wales between 1859 and 1894, in the Bathurst region. It was represented by two members, with voters casting two votes and the first two candidates being elected.

Members for East Macquarie

Election results

References

Former electoral districts of New South Wales
1859 establishments in Australia
1894 disestablishments in Australia
Constituencies established in 1859
Constituencies disestablished in 1894